The cash flow sign convention is that money you pay out has a minus sign, while money you take in has a plus sign (or no sign).
 Most financial calculators (and spreadsheets) follow the Cash Flow Sign Convention. This is simply a way of keeping the direction of the cash flow straight. Cash inflows are entered as positive numbers and cash outflows are entered as negative numbers.

See also
Cash flow

External links
HP-12c reference
Time Value of Money terminology

Cash flow